Didi Holtermann (born Dagny Borghild Ivarson, November 28, 1895 – December 17, 1975) was a Norwegian actress.

Holtermann was born in Kristiania (now Oslo). She had  her film debut in 1922 in  Amund Rydland's Farende folk, in which she played the role of Veronika. In 1924 she appeared in Til sæters, in 1925 in Fager er lien, and in 1926 in Simen Mustrøens besynderlige opplevelser, which was her last film.

Didi Holtermann was married to the actor Magnus Falkberget.

Filmography 
1922: Farende folk as Veronika
1924: Til sæters as Desideria, a servant girl
1925: Fager er lien as Hulda Stiansen
1926: Simen Mustrøens besynderlige opplevelser as Bertille, Simen's wife

References

External links
 
 Didi Holtermann at the Swedish Film Database

1895 births
1975 deaths
Norwegian film actresses
Norwegian silent film actresses
20th-century Norwegian actresses
Actresses from Oslo